Karl Kittsteiner (20 June 1920 – 12 August 2011) was a German racing cyclist. He won the German National Road Race in 1946.

References

External links
 

1920 births
2011 deaths
German male cyclists
German cycling road race champions
Sportspeople from Nuremberg
Cyclists from Bavaria
20th-century German people